Tripteridia subcomosa is a moth in the family Geometridae. It is found in New Guinea and on the southern Moluccas and Borneo.

References

Moths described in 1907
Tripteridia